Duomo of San Giorgio or Duomo di San Giorgio may refer to:
 Duomo of San Giorgio, Modica 
 Duomo of San Giorgio, Ragusa